Once Upon a Time in London is a 2019 British crime drama film directed by Simon Rumley and written by Will Gilbey, Rumley and Terry Stone. The film is about the notorious gangsters Billy Hill and Jack Comer. The film stars Leo Gregory, Terry Stone, Holly Earl, Dominic Keating and Geoff Bell. It was released on 19 April 2019.

Cast

Production 
Simon Rumley directed the film from a script he co-wrote with Will Gilbey and Terry Stone, while Stone would produce the film along with Richard Turner, and Tiernan Hanby would co-produce the film. Gateway Films is the production company behind the film along with Ratio Film Presentation.

Principal photography on the film began on 3 April 2017 in and around London.

Release 
Once Upon a Time in London was released on 19 April 2019 in the United Kingdom.

References

External links 
 

2010s gang films
2019 crime drama films
2019 films
Biographical films about gangsters
British crime drama films
British gangster films
Films about criminals
Gateway Films films
Mafia films
Organized crime films based on actual events
2010s English-language films
2010s British films